The Australian Army Cadets (AAC) is the youth military program and organisation of the Australian Army, tasked with supporting participants to contribute to society, fostering interest in defence force careers, and developing support for the forces. The program has more than 19,000 army cadets between the ages of 12 and 20 based in more than 200 units around Australia. The values of the AAC are "Service, Courage, Respect, Integrity and Excellence".

The cadet programme has strong links to the Australian Army and is a part of the Australian Defence Force Cadets. However, its members are not members of the Australian Defence Force by virtue only of their membership of the AAC. The AAC is a youth development program building resilience in young Australians from all backgrounds.

Activities of the AAC include but are not limited to drill and ceremonial parade, abseiling, seamanship, navigation, field camping and first aid.

Background 
The Australian Army Cadets is authorised under Section 62 of the Defence Act 1903 with lawful policies provided in the Cadet Forces Regulations 2013 (originally authorised under Cadet Forces Regulations 1977). The Australian Army Cadets is a youth organisation that is modelled on the Australian Army. It differs from Scouts Australia and other youth exploration groups as its main focus is that of learning and using military and leadership skills. The organisation boasts a nationwide reach with Cadet units in every state and territory in Australia.

Youth must be at least 12 years of age, and not have reached the age of 17 years to be eligible to apply for enrolment into the AAC. Once enrolled, they may remain as a cadet until the last day of the year they attain the age of 18 years old, however age extensions exist for Battalion Ranks (Battalion CUO/RSM, e.g.) to the age of 19, however this is a very rare occurrence. A cadet in the AAC is not considered to be a member of the Australian Defence Force, nor are cadets allowed to be a member of the Defence Force or any other cadet service during their time as a cadet.

Research studies have shown that cadets have performed better than non-cadets in Australian Defence Force Training, and 25.4% of the Australian Defence Force has been in the Australian Defence Force Cadets. From 2001 to 2005, cadets made up 10% of applications and 11% of total Australian Defence Force enlistments.

History 

The King's School and Newington College vie for the honour of having the oldest Cadet Corps in Australia. An embryonic corps was founded by Newington College when a drill master was appointed to staff in 1865. Two years later, a sergeant-major was appointed and muskets and carbines were purchased and an armoury and gunpowder store were opened at Newington College. The first official unit in Australia was established on 29 March 1866 at St Mark's Collegiate School by Reverend Macarthur. In June 1868, The King's School had closed and did not reopen until January 1869, when it was amalgamated with the St Mark's unit, the unit was renamed The King's School Cadets Corps. In 1869, the Newington College Cadet Corps was formally incorporated by the Governor of New South Wales (Somerset Lowry-Corry, 4th Earl Belmore) and that unit is now believed to be the second oldest continually running corps in Australia, after The King's School Cadet Corps. The first regional unit, and third oldest continually running corps in the country, was established in September 1898 by The Armidale School. With the establishment of many cadet units and corps at numerous boys schools throughout the Commonwealth, His Majesty King Edward VII established the Commonwealth Cadet Corps in Australia on 16 July 1906.

However, military training to students commenced in 1851 in the Port Phillip Colony of New South Wales, the year Victoria separated from NSW, when Sergeant Major Cleary from the 12th Regiment of Foot, based at Victoria Barracks (Melbourne), commenced drill instruction to students at Scotch College before the establishment of their cadet unit in 1884 when The Volunteer (Cadet) Act 1884 came into effect. A school holiday was proclaimed on 19 November 1886 to mark the occasion of the first public parade of the Victorian Cadet Force at Albert Park. More than 2000 cadets representing the units of 41 state schools, 11 independent or private schools and one catholic school were inspected by the Governor.

In 1910, the universal training scheme was introduced. Under the scheme, all medically fit males 14–20 years of age had to serve in cadets. Boys who did not comply were charged and dealt with by the courts. Training cadets were divided into two groups. Senior cadets aged between 16 and 18 years of age were attached to Militia Units (now known as Army Reserve Units), called Regimental Detachments, while students aged between 14 and 16 years of age remained as school cadets. Officers came from teaching staff and selected cadets were made "Cadet Lieutenants". In 1939, the outbreak of World War II caused the Regimental Detachments to be disbanded as staff were needed to train soldiers for overseas service. Some School Based Units closed down while some struggled on. By the end of World War II, Regimental Detachments had been re-raised. Between 1949 and 1975, School Based Units were attached to Citizen Military Forces units. The CMF is the precursor of the modern day Australian Army Reserve. Regimental Units continued to exist. By 1951, The Commonwealth Cadet Corps was renamed the Australian Cadet Corps (ACC) and on 2 June 1953, The Duke of Edinburgh became the Colonel-in-Chief of the ACC, as a part of the coronation of his wife, Queen Elizabeth II. The Duke of Edinburgh presented his banner as a gift to the Corps on 2 May 1970 at Victoria Barracks, Sydney. At this time, there were 46,000 cadets in Australia.

In 1975, the ACC was disbanded by the Whitlam Labor government and was re-raised by the Fraser Liberal government on 1 October 1976. By 1981, the ACC had 20,650 cadets. As a result of the Beazley Defence review white paper in 1984, full military support was withdrawn from school based cadet units, now classed as Limited Support Units (LSU). Military support for LSUs was limited solely to the discretionary loan of equipment for Annual camps. Uniforms, transport, rations and personal equipment all had to be funded by the school, parents or community organisations such as the RSL. As a result, most government school based cadet units closed between 1984 and 1986. Instead, full military support was provided to cadet units based at existing Army depots, now classified as Regional Cadet Units (RCU). Some school based units in disadvantaged areas or located some distance from a military depot were given RCU status. Many RCUs attracted cadets from the nearby school based units recently closed down. In NSW, the first RCU formed was 20 RCU Ashfield, originally Punchbowl High School Cadets, and then based at the 2 Construction Group depot of RAE in Haberfield, Sydney in early 1984. By 1998, however all cadet units again received full support. During 1993, the Australian Cadet Corps was renamed the Australian Army Cadet Corps. Many cadet units were now re-equipped with DPCU uniforms replacing the older green uniforms. In 2001, the Australian Army Cadet Corps was renamed the Australian Army Cadets as part of major reforms brought about with the Topley review and during 2004, the title of Regional Cadet Unit (RCU) was dropped in favour of Army Cadet Unit (ACU).

Governor-General Michael Jeffery presented a replacement banner on behalf of the Duke to Parade Commander and National Cadet Adjutant CUO Christopher Casey (of 236 ACU Toukley) on behalf of the AAC to commemorate the centenary of the cadets on 24 September 2005, with the old Duke of Edinburgh Banner laid up at the Soldiers Chapel at Kapooka during the 2006 Chief of Army Cadet Team Challenge.

The AAC celebrated its centenary since the establishment of the Commonwealth Cadet Corps on 16 July 2006, as opposed to the centenaries of individual units, with the Victorian Brigade holding a large parade to mark the event.

As of 2019, the largest individual AAC unit is the Knox Grammar School Army Cadet Unit (KGSACU), with 1100 members.

Structure 

 Headquarters of the Australian Army.	
 Headquarters Australian Army Cadets (HQAAC).	
 Regional Headquarters (Brigades or Battalions, depending on number of cadets).	
 Headquarters New South Wales AAC Brigade (HQ NSW AAC BDE) (Which includes the Australian Capital Territory and Norfolk Island)
 Headquarters New South Wales 2nd AAC Brigade (HQ NSW 2nd AAC BDE)
 Headquarters Victoria AAC Brigade (HQ VIC AAC BDE)	
 Headquarters North Queensland AAC Brigade (HQ NQLD AAC BDE)	
 Headquarters South Queensland AAC Brigade (HQ SQLD AAC BDE)	
 Headquarters Tasmania AAC Battalion (HQ TAS AAC BN)	
 Headquarters Northern Territory AAC Battalion (HQ NT AAC BN)	
 Headquarters Western Australia AAC Brigade (HQ WA AAC BDE)	
 Headquarters South Australia AAC Brigade (HQ SA AAC BDE)	
 Brigades are then broken up into Battalions.
 Cadet Units are usually based on a company structure (the larger units are based on a battalion structure), and are under the control of both the Battalion and Brigade HQs.

Note: Although most regional headquarters are state based, Queensland has been split into North and South due to their combined size. Additionally, most School Based Units (SBUs) in New South Wales are part of New South Wales 2nd Australian Army Cadets Brigade.

Controversies 

The Australian public generally view the AAC as a positive youth development program. Political views have constantly changed throughout the years. The AAC has been subject to criticism, most notably because of its military uniform, program, discipline and structure in youth training. In the 1970s, under the Whitlam government, the AAC was briefly disestablished from defence force and government control and support and military-like training was suspended and reviewed. However, many units continued under private operation.

In 2007, a Scotch College Cadet Unit cadet, Nathan Francis, died from an anaphylactic reaction to a combat ration pack, resulting in the particular type of rations being withdrawn from use.

National Cadet Advisory Council
The National Cadet Advisory Council is the link between cadets and officers in the Australian Army Cadets, system. The NATCAC, as it is commonly known, endeavours in improve cadets and the standard of cadets any way it can. The NATCAC generally meets once a year, with regional CAC's meeting at least once a school semester. Although named the same, this should not be confused with the National Cadet Advisory Council of Civil Air Patrol, the United States Air Force Auxiliary.

Meets at least once a year. Items to be discussed are compiled previous to the meeting by the NATCUO, and are based around what was brought up in RCAC meetings. Minutes from each meeting are recorded and passed onto the CO of the AAC.

Members of the NATCAC 

The NATCAC is chaired by the National Cadet Under Officer, the National Cadet Adjutant and the National Cadet Regimental Sergeant Major. The Regional Cadet Under Officer and Regional Cadet RSM of each AAC region make up the council. The regions are divided as follows; North Queensland, South Queensland, New South Wales, New South Wales 2nd, Victoria, Tasmania, South Australia, Western Australia and Northern Territory.

Uniform
Cadets wear "Auscam" DPCU uniforms for field activities. As of 2023, cadets now wear AMCU in both barracks and ceremonial orders of dress. In order to distinguish cadets from Australian soldiers, cadets wear a blue oval patch in a similar shape to the ADF service badges but with the Corps's "sword and torch emblem" on it, epaulets always have the prefix "Army Cadet" for cadets or "AAC" for instructors added to them. Cadet's slouch hats generally have a metal "sword and torch" badge at the front and a blue and yellow patch on the right side, although some School-Based Units issue their own badges.

Previously cadets could also wear ceremonial uniform identical to that of the Australian Army.

Cadets of more senior ranks may wear additional accouterments that help to distinguish their rank, such as a red sash for Cadet Sergeants and Cadet Warrant Officer Class Two, Sam Browne belts for Cadet Warrant Officer Class One and Cadet Under Officers.

Cadets Rank System

Officer of Cadets (OOC) Rank

See also 
 Australian Air Force Cadets
 Australian Navy Cadets
 Australian Defence Force Cadets

References

External links 

 Official Australian Army Cadets (AAC) Website
 AAC Members Website

Australian Army
Army cadet organisations
Australian cadet organisations